Hopton Castle is a small village and civil parish in south Shropshire, England.

The village grew up near to the keep of Hopton Castle, which was opened as a visitor attraction in 2011. Nearby is the hamlet of Hopton Heath, with its railway station on the Heart of Wales Line. Also nearby are the villages of Bedstone, Bucknell and Clungunford.

Instead of a parish council it has a parish meeting; this is due to the very small population of the parish.

Hopton Titterhill
Within the parish, to the southwest of the village, lies Hopton Titterhill, a wooded hill which is open access land.

See also
Listed buildings in Hopton Castle

References

Villages in Shropshire
Civil parishes in Shropshire